Chalthan railway station is a railway station in Surat district of Gujarat state of India. It is under Mumbai WR railway division of Western Railway zone of Indian Railways. It is located on Udhna – Jalgaon main line of the Indian Railways.

It is located at 21 m above sea level and has three platforms. As of 2016, electrified double broad-gauge railway line exists at this station. Passenger, MEMU trains halt here

See also
 Surat district

References

Railway stations in Surat district
Mumbai WR railway division